Cory O'Brien (born 20 June 1972) is an Australian wrestler. He competed at the 1996 Summer Olympics and the 2000 Summer Olympics.

References

External links
 

1972 births
Living people
Australian male sport wrestlers
Olympic wrestlers of Australia
Wrestlers at the 1996 Summer Olympics
Wrestlers at the 2000 Summer Olympics
Sportspeople from Melbourne
Commonwealth Games bronze medallists for Australia
Commonwealth Games medallists in wrestling
Wrestlers at the 1994 Commonwealth Games
Medallists at the 1994 Commonwealth Games